Warfield's Range, also known as Philla Terra and Dr. Thomas Chew Warfield's Homestead, is a historic slave plantation home located between Laurel and Columbia in Howard County, Maryland.

On 26 March 1696, Richard and John Warfield surveyed a 1,080 acre land patent named Warfield's Range along with others that totaled 1,862 acres. A log cabin was built onsite during this time which survived until 2001. In 1703, Richard Warfield granted 150 acres of Warfield's Range including the cabin to his daughter Rachel Warfield Yates. In 1765, 240 acres of the range were inherited by Benjamin Warfield's son Joshua Warfield. In 1845 Thomas Chew Worthington updated the log cabin interior with random width wood floors.

After Peter Gorman completed his railroad contract, he purchased the 500-acre estate Fairview in North Laurel from Dr. Charles Griffith Worthington. The property was part of Warfiled's Range, containing the 1696 log cabin that survived until an arson fire in 2001 when relocated to accommodate the Warfield's Range development.

See also
 List of Howard County properties in the Maryland Historical Trust
 Christ Church Guilford

References

Houses completed in 1703
Howard County, Maryland landmarks
Houses in Howard County, Maryland
Buildings and structures in Laurel, Maryland
1703 establishments in Maryland
Plantations in Maryland
 
Gorman family of Maryland